Peter G. Schultz (born June 23, 1956)  is an American chemist.  He is the CEO and Professor of Chemistry at The Scripps Research Institute, the founder and former director of GNF, and the founding director of the California Institute for Biomedical Research (Calibr), established in 2012. In August 2014, Nature Biotechnology ranked Schultz the #1 top translational researcher in 2013.

Academic career

Schultz completed his undergraduate degree at Caltech in 1979 and continued there for his doctoral degree (in 1984) with Peter Dervan. His thesis work focused on the generation and characterization of 1,1-diazenes and the generation of sequence-selective polypyrrole DNA binding/cleaving molecules.  He then spent a year at the Massachusetts Institute of Technology with Christopher Walsh before joining the chemistry faculty at the University of California, Berkeley.  He became a Principal Investigator of Lawrence Berkeley National Laboratory in 1985 and an investigator of the Howard Hughes Medical Institute in 1994.  In 1999 Schultz moved to The Scripps Research Institute and also became founding Director of the Genomics Institute of the Novartis Research Foundation (GNF), which was initiated purely as a genomic research outlet of Novartis, but which grew during Schultz's tenure to include a significant drug discovery effort and more than triple the number of intended employees (currently over 500 people). In March 2010, he left GNF to return to the non-profit sector and founded the California Institute for Biomedical Research (Calibr) in March 2012.  He has trained over 300 graduate students and postdoctoral fellows, many of whom are on the faculties of major research universities.

Research

Combinatorial chemistry and molecular evolution

Much of Schultz's work consists of finding ways to do a great many similar experiments at the same time, on many different compounds.  He is one of the leading pioneers in combinatorial chemistry, screenable molecular libraries, and "high-throughput" chemistry.  His interests are extremely wide-ranging, with applications in such diverse areas as catalytic mechanisms, cell-specialization and other complex biological processes (normally studied by biologists, not chemists), basic photochemistry, biophysical probes of all stripes from NMR through positron-emission, and solid-state materials science.

Early in his career Schultz showed that the natural molecular diversity of the immune system could be directed to generate catalytic antibodies.  This method enabled the subsequent development of many new selective enzyme-like catalysts for reactions ranging from acyl transfer and redox reactions to pericyclic and metalation reactions.  Although their catalytic activities are only rarely strong enough to be of practical use, catalytic antibodies have provided important new insights in our understanding of biocatalysis, structural plasticity of proteins, evolution of biochemical function, and the immune system itself.

Schultz then applied molecular diversity—the strategy of creating a large community of different molecules, plus a method for fishing out and identifying the ones that do what you want—to a range of problems in chemistry, biology and materials science.  Along with Richard Lerner, he was one of the critical players in the development of phage-display libraries, and surface-library chips.  For high-throughput bioassays which require freely soluble test-compounds, he uses microrobotic fluid-manipulation systems, adapted for 1,536-microwell cell-culture plates, to separately treat very small cell colonies with large numbers (hundreds of thousands) of different compounds.

Using these various high-throughput and combinatorial experimental approaches, Schultz has identified materials with novel optical, electronic, and catalytic properties; also, proteins and small molecules which control important biological processes such as aging, cancer, autoimmunity, and stem-cell differentiation and de-specialization back to pluripotency.

Unnatural amino acids

Schultz has pioneered a method for adding new building blocks, beyond the common twenty amino acids, to the genetic codes of prokaryotic and eukaryotic organisms.  This is accomplished by screening libraries of mutant amino acyl tRNA synthetases for mutants which charge nonsense-codon tRNAs with the desired unnatural amino acid.  The organism which expresses such a synthetase can then be genetically programmed to incorporate the unnatural amino acid into a desired protein in the usual way, with the nonsense codon now coding for the unnatural amino acid.  Normally, the unnatural amino acid itself must be synthesized in the lab and supplied to the organism by adding it to the organism's growth medium.  The unnatural amino acid must also be able to pass through the organism's cell membrane into the interior of the organism.

More than seventy unnatural amino acids have been genetically encoded in bacteria, yeast, and mammalian cells, including photoreactive, chemically reactive, fluorescent, spin-active, sulfated, pre-phosphorylated, and metal-binding amino acids.  This technology allows chemists to probe, and change, the properties of proteins, in vitro or in vivo, by directing novel, lab-synthesized chemical moieties specifically into any chosen site of any protein of interest.

A bacterial organism has been generated which biosynthesizes a novel, previously unnatural amino acid (p-aminophenylalanine) from basic carbon sources and includes this amino acid in its genetic code.  This is the first example of the creation of an autonomous twenty-one-amino-acid organism.

Unnatural genetic information 

Schultz's group has recently created bacteria whose chromosomes include unnatural DNA-bases, and bacteria whose chromosomes are hybrids which include both RNA and DNA.

Origins of mitochondria 

In order to probe details of the traditionally accepted hypothesis that mitochondria originated when independent bacteria capable of respiratory (oxygen-dependent) metabolism took up residence inside host cells which had previously only been capable of fermentation (metabolism without using oxygen), and evolved to establish a symbiotic relationship with them, Schultz's group has created bacteria capable of surviving inside yeast cells and maintaining a symbiotic relationship with the host yeast cells by carrying out reactions which the yeast cells cannot catalyze without the bacteria. One goal of this work is to culture the yeast-bacteria hybrids and see whether the bacterial genome evolves to increase the mutual benefits of its chemical interactions with the host cells, as has happened with mitochondria over time.

Commercial activities
He is a founder of Affymax Research Institute, Symyx Technologies, Syrrx, Kalypsys, Phenomix, Ilypsa, Ambrx, and Wildcat Discovery Technologies.

Publications and retractions
Schultz has authored around 500 papers.

One of his papers in 2013 PNAS about making more stable antibodies was retracted, due to suspect data from co-author Shiladitya Sen:
  Retraction notice: 

Two papers from his lab published in 2004, one in Science and one in Journal of the American Chemical Society, were retracted in 2009, related to work in the Shultz lab by a postdoc, Zhiwen Zhang, on incorporating non-native glycosylated amino acids into proteins.  Had it succeeded, this method could have become an essential tool for investigating the functions of carbohydrate attachments to proteins; however, the work could not be replicated, and when the lab went to find the relevant notebooks, they were missing. In the course of the investigation, Zhang received emails and phone calls blackmailing him, and at one point the person doing this wrote to several institutions and Science saying that he or she was going to commit suicide.  The lab eventually identified the problem as a misunderstanding of the function of a key enzyme used in the experiments. The papers were:
  Retraction notice: 
  Retraction notice:

Awards
Schultz is a member of the National Academy of Sciences, USA (1993), the Institute of Medicine of the National Academy of Sciences (1998).

2019 Tetrahedron Prize 
2016 Heinrich Wieland Prize
2015 Honorary doctorate from Yale University
2013 The Laureate Chemistry for the Future Solvay Prize
2006 ACS Arthur C. Cope Award
2003 Paul Ehrlich and Ludwig Darmstaedter Prize
1995 honorary doctorate from Uppsala University, Sweden
1994 Wolf Prize in Chemistry
1990 ACS Award in Pure Chemistry
1988 NSF Alan T. Waterman Award

References

External links
The Schultz group website at Scripps Research

1956 births
Members of the United States National Academy of Sciences
Members of the National Academy of Medicine
Living people
American geneticists
21st-century American chemists
Scripps Research faculty
Wolf Prize in Chemistry laureates
Howard Hughes Medical Investigators
UC Berkeley College of Chemistry faculty